Congressman Stone may refer to:
William Johnson Stone (1841-1923), Congressman from Kentucky
William Joel Stone (1848–1918), Congressman from Missouri
Frederick Stone (1820–1899), Congressman from Maryland
Congressman Stone from Command Decision (film)